Brian Carolin (born 6 December 1939) was an English footballer who played as a wing half.

Carolin started his career with Ashington Welfare Juniors before joining Gateshead in 1957. He made 17 appearances in three seasons for Gateshead before moving to Blyth Spartans in 1960.

Sources

1939 births
English footballers
Association football midfielders
Gateshead F.C. players
Blyth Spartans A.F.C. players
English Football League players
Living people